Pietro Bragaglia (1890 - ?) was an Italian gymnast, best known to be the first Italian flag bearer at the Summer Olympics.

Biography
It was the first Italian flag bearer of the history of the Olympic Games, 18 years old at the 1908 Summer Olympics in London, but did not participate in the competitions.

See also
 List of flag bearers for Italy at the Olympics

References

External links
 Italy - Flag Bearers at the Summer Olympics (from Sports Reference web site)

1890 births
Italian male artistic gymnasts
Sportspeople from Ferrara
Year of death missing